Sebastián Prieto (born 19 May 1975) is an Argentine former professional tennis player.

Primarily a doubles specialist, Prieto has won ten doubles titles in his career.  He began playing for the Argentina Davis Cup team in 1999.

Prieto coached Juan Martín del Potro from 2017 to 2020.

ATP career finals

Doubles: 26 (10 titles, 16 runner-ups)

ATP Challenger and ITF Futures finals

Singles: 6 (4–2)

Doubles: 38 (28–10)

Performance timelines

Singles

Doubles

Notes

References

External links
 
 Sebastián Prieto at the Association of Tennis Professionals Coach Profile
 
 

Argentine male tennis players
Tennis players from Buenos Aires
Argentine sportspeople of Italian descent
1975 births
Living people